The flag of Wallonia is a sub-national flag in Belgium that represents the Walloon Region and French Community. Designed in 1913, the flag depicts a red rooster, commonly known as the bold rooster or Walloon rooster, on a yellow field. The red and yellow coloring is historically associated with the city of Liège. The flag's association with Wallonia also mean that it is commonly used by the Walloon Movement.

History
Before the present flag was created, the Walloons used the French flag.
The rooster was created in 1913, based on a painting by Pierre Paulus, but choosing the colors of Liège was not obvious from the start. In the beginning, the image of a rooster on the French tricolor was often used, this design survived as a flag of Rattachism.

On 3 July 1991, the French Community adopted by decree the Walloon Flag as its symbol, confirming an older decree from the former French Cultural Community of Belgium on 20 July 1975.

On 15 July 1998, the Walloon Flag was officially recognised as the Flag of Wallonia by the Walloon Region.

See also
Gallic rooster
Flag of Belgium
Flag of Flanders
Flag of the Brussels-Capital Region

References

Further reading

External links
The Flag on the website "Connaître la Wallonie" (in French).
Notice on the Walloon Flag based on the online Encyclopedia of the Walloon Movement.
The official flag of the French Community of Belgium on its website.

Wallonia
Walloon culture
Flags displaying animals